Bush hid the facts is a common name for a bug present in some versions of Microsoft Windows, which causes text encoded in ASCII to be interpreted as if it were UTF-16LE, resulting in garbled text. When the string "Bush hid the facts", without quotes, was put in a new Notepad document and saved, closed, and reopened, the nonsensical sequence of Chinese characters "" would appear instead.

Other sequences trigger the bug as well, including simply the text . (This most commonly used sentence is a reference to U.S. President George W. Bush's statements about nuclear weapons in Iraq.)

The bug occurs when the string is passed to the Win32 charset detection function IsTextUnicode. IsTextUnicode sees that the bytes match the UTF-16LE encoding of assigned Unicode code points, concludes that the text is valid UTF-16LE, and returns true, and the application then incorrectly interprets the text as UTF-16LE.

Many text editors and tools exhibit this behavior on Windows because they use IsTextUnicode to determine the encoding of text files. As of Windows Vista, Notepad has been modified to use a different detection algorithm that does not exhibit the bug, but IsTextUnicode remains unchanged in the operating system, so any other tools that use the function are still affected.

Workarounds
Several workarounds exist for this bug:
Editing the text to not be a pattern that triggers this bug will avoid it.  For instance, adding a new line in the first 20 characters will work.
If the file is saved as "UTF-8" (before 2018) or "UTF-8 with BOM" (after 2018) rather than "ANSI" the text loads correctly, because Notepad prepends a UTF-8 byte order mark, which is a pattern that does not trigger the bug. Opening a file that is valid UTF-8 without the byte order mark would still trigger the bug, as this sequence is represented identically in UTF-8 as in ASCII.
The bug is also avoided by saving as "Unicode", which in Microsoft Windows means UTF-16LE. When loading this text IsTextUnicode should (and does) return true and the text is correct.
To retrieve the original text using Notepad, bring up the "Open a file" dialog box, select the file, select "ANSI" or "UTF-8" in the "Encoding" list box, and click Open. Under Windows 2000, Notepad lacks the "Encoding" list box. Notepad2 also lacks this. WordPad appears to load the text correctly without choosing the encoding, since it uses its own encoding detection.

References

External links 
 The Notepad file encoding problem, redux – Raymond Chen
 IsTextUnicode – MSDN Library

Character encoding
Software bugs
Microsoft Windows